Kirkia dewinteri is a small tree in the Kirkiaceae, endemic to the dry savanna of the Kaokoveld in Namibia. Bark is yellow with blackish spots. Fruit a small woody capsule splitting into four valves.

References

Sapindales
Endemic flora of Namibia
Trees of Africa
Least concern plants
Least concern biota of Africa
Taxonomy articles created by Polbot